Matt Bissonette is a former United States Navy SEAL and author of No Easy Day, a book which he wrote using the pen name Mark Owen. The book chronicles his life and military service, but mostly is about his involvement with Operation Neptune Spear. Bissonnette writes that he was present on the third floor of Osama Bin Laden's compound in Abbottabad when the terrorist leader was killed.

Military career 
Bissonnette grew up hunting and fishing in a remote Alaskan town called Aniak. After graduating high school in 1994, he attended Biola University and earned his Bachelor's degree in Sociology in 1998. He then enlisted in the Navy, graduating with BUD/S class 226 as the Honor-man (top of the class) in 1999 and served with SEAL Team Five. Marcus Luttrell was briefly in class 226, but due to injury later graduated class 228. During Bissonnette's first deployment 9/11 happened and he was among the first to be deployed in support of the GWOT. In 2004 he completed selection and training to enter the Naval Special Warfare Development Group (DEVGRU) and participated in several operations in Iraq and Afghanistan.

Bissonnette was involved in the Maersk Alabama hijacking rescue operation in 2009 and Operation Neptune Spear in 2011, both alongside DEVGRU teammate Robert J. O'Neill, who claims to have fired the shots that killed Bin Laden. Bissonnette claims in his book that an unnamed DEVGRU teammate actually fired the shots that killed Bin Laden, not O'Neill who claims that the unnamed teammate fired and missed.

Some SEALs question whether it is possible to ever determine whose shots killed the terrorist leader. Post retirement, both SEALs received criticism for their books and differences in their accounts of the events. A DoD investigation revealed that Bissonnette and six other SEALs had served as consultants on the video game, Medal of Honor: Warfighter, at Bissonnette's urging. Letters of reprimand, which are damaging to Naval careers, were sent to all seven. The SEALs did not seek clearance with their superiors to be involved with the project and showed the developers some of their gear.

At the end of his service, Bissonnette earned the title "Team Leader" and had conducted hundreds of missions throughout 13 combat deployments overseas.

Post-military career 
Almost a year after the Bin Laden mission, Bissonette left active duty and began writing No Easy Day with journalist Kevin Maurer. Bissonnette says the book accurately portrays the events of Operation Neptune Spear.

The book was published by Dutton Penguin and went on sale 4 September 2012. Bissonnette stated that most of the proceeds from the book will be donated to families of SEALs killed in action.

Bissonnette and his publisher decided to release the book without first submitting it for a United States Department of Defense(DoD) review, which generated much controversy. The DoD claims the book contains classified information, which the book's publisher and Bissonnette deny. This ultimately led the publisher to release the book on 4 September, a week earlier than the originally planned 11 September release date. It also made the New York Times bestseller list.

A few months before coming to National attention, Bissonnette sold his family's Virginia Beach home and quietly left town.

In 2014, Bissonnette published a follow-up, No Hero: The Evolution of a Navy SEAL, which was vetted by the DoD, but was still investigated by the government. The book does not address the controversy caused by the first book. Bissonnette says the government redacted a lot of it which he appealed, but was only able to clear about 50 percent of them.

In August 2016, Bissonnette settled a lawsuit and agreed to pay back his royalties of US$6.8 million to the US government.

Bissonnette was interviewed twice on 60 Minutes, with the first interview receiving 12.32 million viewers. His appearance was disguised by skilled makeup artists so well that even his lawyer did not recognize him. His voice was also disguised. Bissonnette continues to hide his face and use the pseudonym "Mark Owen." He is also an executive producer on the TV show SEAL Team.

Bissonnette continues to serve on the advisory board of the GWOT Memorial Foundation as well as advocating for transitioning veterans and helping raise money and awareness for multiple veteran-related charities.

Awards and decorations 
Bissonnette received more than 30 medals and awards according to a short biography from the Navy. Here are a few confirmed ones:<ref
name="AAE"/>

References

Military personnel from Alaska
Recipients of the Silver Star
American non-fiction writers
Biola University alumni
United States Navy SEALs personnel
Year of birth missing (living people)
Living people